Allied Maritime Command (MARCOM) is the central command of all NATO maritime forces and the Commander MARCOM is the prime maritime advisor to the Alliance. When directed by the Supreme Allied Commander Europe (SACEUR), it provides the core of the headquarters responsible for the conduct of maritime operations. The command is based at the Northwood Headquarters in northwest London.



History
The Commander-in-Chief, Home Fleet (Royal Navy), gained a NATO responsibility as Commander-in-Chief Eastern Atlantic Area (CINCEASTLANT), as part of SACLANT, when the NATO military command structure was established in 1953. CINCEASTLANT headquarters was established at the Northwood Headquarters in northwest London.

Commander-in-Chief Eastern Atlantic was redesignated as Commander, Allied Maritime Component Command Northwood ('CC-Mar' or AMCCN) around 2004. The command, which was renamed Allied Maritime Command Northwood in 2010, reports to Allied Joint Force Command Brunssum.

At the 2010 NATO Summit in Lisbon it was decided to create a leaner and more effective command structure. This reduced the number of major headquarters from 11 to 7 and, in particular, led to the deactivation of the Allied Maritime Command Naples on 27 March 2013 leaving the newly named MARCOM as the sole maritime component in NATO.

MARCOM led Operation Active Endeavour, NATO's only Article-5 operation which ended in 2016. MARCOM also led Operation Ocean Shield, NATO's counter-piracy operation in the Gulf of Aden and Indian Ocean which also ended in 2016.

Currently, MARCOM leads Operation Sea Guardian designed as a Maritime Security Operation to provide security in the Mediterranean Sea.

Role
MARCOM was created through the North Atlantic Council to ensure the interoperability of NATO maritime forces, and placed directly under the Supreme Allied Commander Europe to be the leading voice on maritime issues within the Alliance. It is responsible for planning and conducting all NATO maritime operations.

Current Structure

Standing Maritime Groups 
MARCOM leads four standing NATO maritime groups, two frigate groups and two mine countermeasures groups. The Standing NATO Maritime Groups are a multinational, integrated maritime force made up of vessels from allied countries. The ships and any aircraft aboard are available to NATO to support Alliance tasking. These groups provide NATO with a continuous maritime capability. The command is also responsible for additional naval assets as they support NATO missions.

Current groups are: 
 Standing NATO Maritime Group 1 (SNMG1)
 Standing NATO Maritime Group 2 (SNMG2)
 Standing NATO Mine Countermeasures Group 1 (SNMCMG1)
 Standing NATO Mine Countermeasures Group 2 (SNMCMG2).

References

External links
 

Formations of the NATO Military Command Structure 1994–present
Buildings and structures in Three Rivers District
Naval units and formations
Military units and formations established in 2012
Military units and formations in Hertfordshire
Organisations based in Hertfordshire